Bank BPS Basket Kwidzyn is a Polish basketball team, based in Kwidzyn, playing in Dominet Bank Ekstraliga.

Achievements

 Promotion to 1 liga in 2004
 Promotion to Dominet Bank Ekstraliga in season 2006/2007
 8th place in Dominet Bank Ekstraliga after regular season, 9th place after pre-play-off in 2007/2008

Basketball teams in Poland
Kwidzyn County
Sport in Pomeranian Voivodeship